Onartuzumab is a humanized monoclonal antibody designed for the treatment of advanced non-small-cell lung cancer.

Onartuzumab was developed by Genentech, Inc. It is undergoing clinical trials.

References 

Monoclonal antibodies